The Legend of the Condor Heroes is a wuxia novel by Chinese writer Jin Yong (Louis Cha). It is the first part of the Condor Trilogy and is followed by The Return of the Condor Heroes and The Heaven Sword and Dragon Saber. It was first serialised between 1 January 1957 and 19 May 1959 in Hong Kong Commercial Daily. Jin Yong revised the novel twice, first in the 1970s and later in the 2000s. The English title is imprecise since neither species of the condor, the Andean condor and Californian condor, is native to China.

Plot
The story is set in China during the wars between the Jurchen-led Jin Empire and the predominantly ethnic Han Song Empire. Yang Tiexin and Guo Xiaotian, a pair of sworn brothers, pledge that their unborn children will become either sworn siblings (if both are of the same sex) or a married couple (if they are of opposite sexes). One day, Yang Tiexin's wife, Bao Xiruo, saves a wounded Jurchen warrior, who turns out to be Wanyan Honglie, the sixth prince of the Jin Empire. Smitten by Bao Xirou's beauty Wanyan Honglie later sends his troops to attack Yang Tiexin and Guo Xiaotian's village. Guo Xiaotian is killed while Yang Tiexin goes missing.

Guo Xiaotian's pregnant wife, Li Ping, wanders into Mongolia, where she gives birth to their son, Guo Jing, who grows up in Mongolia under the care of Genghis Khan. He learns martial arts from the "Seven Freaks of Jiangnan" and Ma Yu of the Quanzhen School, as well as archery skills from Jebe. The Chinese title of the novel is derived from an incident in Guo Jing's youth when he shot two eagles with a single arrow. On the other hand, a pregnant Bao Xiruo captured by Wanyan Honglie, believing her husband to be dead agrees to marry Wanyan Honglie. She gives birth to a son, Yang Kang, who is raised as a Jurchen nobleman. Although he is mentored by Qiu Chuji of the Quanzhen School, he also secretly learns the evil "Nine Yin White Bone Claw" technique from Mei Chaofeng.

Guo Jing is honest, loyal and righteous, but slow-witted. In contrast, Yang Kang is clever, but scheming and treacherous. They eventually meet each other and their respective lovers, Huang Rong and Mu Nianci. The main plot follows Guo Jing and Huang Rong's adventures and their encounters with the "Five Greats", the five most powerful martial artists in the wulin (martial artists' community). During their adventures, both Guo Jing and Huang Rong learn various martial arts techniques from the most powerful martial artists in wulin at that time.  Guo Jing also discovers who was behind the death of his father.  

Meanwhile, Yang Kang plots with the Jurchens to conquer his native land, the Song Empire. Yang Kang refuses to acknowledge his Han ethnicity and is strongly driven to acquire wealth, fame and glory. His treachery is slowly unveiled throughout the novel in the encounters he has with Guo Jing and Huang Rong.

With Guo Jing's assistance, the Mongols conquers the Jin Empire and subsequently turn their attention towards the Song Empire. Guo Jing is unwilling to aid the Mongols in attacking his native land so he leaves them and returns to the Song Empire to helps his fellow Han people counter the impending Mongol invasion. On the other hand, Yang Kang dies from poisoning after attempting to kill Huang Rong with a palm strike, but ends up hitting her spiked soft armour, which was accidentally stained with poison. He leaves behind Mu Nianci and their unborn son, whom Guo Jing names "Yang Guo". In the meantime, the Mongol invasion of the Song Empire is temporarily halted when Genghis Khan dies.

Characters

English translation
The novel has been translated into English in 4 volumes:
A Hero Born by Anna Holmwood
A Bond Undone by Gigi Chang
A Snake Lies Waiting by Anna Holmwood and Gigi Chang
A Heart Divided by Gigi Chang and Shelly Bryant

Adaptations

Films

Television

Comics
In 1998, Hong Kong's Ming Ho Press (明河社) published a 38 volume manhua series illustrated by Lee Chi Ching. This was published in Indonesia by MNC Comics in 2000.

Video games
Shachou Eiyuuden: The Eagle Shooting Heroes is a video game developed by Sony Computer Entertainment for the PlayStation.
Street Fighter Online: Mouse Generation is a PC fighting game that included Mei Chaofeng and Zhou Botong as playable characters.

References

 
1957 novels
Depictions of Genghis Khan in literature
Novels set in the Jin dynasty (1115–1234)
Novels set in the 13th century
Novels about revenge
Novels by Jin Yong
Novels first published in serial form
Novels set in Mongol Empire
Novels set in the Southern Song
Works originally published in the Hong Kong Commercial Daily
Hangzhou in fiction
Chinese novels adapted into television series
Novels set in Zhejiang
Novels set in Shaanxi